Hertford Weir is a 65 meter weir on the River Lea, opposite the Hertford Basin marina and Hartham Common, in Hertford, England.

References

Weirs on the River Lea
Buildings and structures in Hertford